Næstved is a municipality (Danish, kommune) in Region Sjælland on the island of Zealand (Sjælland) in the south of Denmark. The municipality includes the island of Gavnø.  It covers an area of 681 km², and has a total population of 83,801 (2022).  Its mayor is Carsten Rasmussen, a member of the Social Democrats (Socialdemokraterne) political party. The main town and the site of its municipal council is the town of Næstved.

On 1 January 2007, Kommunalreformen ("The Municipal Reform" of 2007) merged the Næstved municipality with existing Fladså, Fuglebjerg, Holmegaard, and Suså municipalities to form the new Næstved municipality, increasing the total population to more than 80,000.

Locations 
The ten largest locations in the municipality are:

Politics

Municipal council
Næstved's municipal council consists of 31 members, elected every four years.

Below are the municipal councils elected since the Municipal Reform of 2007.

Attractions
 Gavnø Castle on the island of Gavnø has a large, beautiful park with seasonal flower displays.  A magnificent display of spring bulbs can be seen during the month of May.  The castle has an extensive collection of paintings.  In addition to the castle and grounds, there is a church, a live, tropical butterfly collection, and a collection of historic firetrucks.  It is open annually from mid-April until the end of August.
 The boat Friheden ("Freedom") runs regular, round-trip  service from May–August.  The 2½ hour trip starts in the center of Næstved, and goes through the Næstved Canal, to the Gavnø Castle, and out on Karrebæk Fjord to the town of Karrebæksminde before returning to Næstved.  It is possible to disembark at Gavnø and at Karrebæksminde.
 Herlufsholm School is Denmark's oldest private boarding school.
 Susåen ("The Suså River"), Zealand's largest waterway and longest river, runs through Næstved.

Notable people 

 Claus Daa (1579 in Ravnstrup – 1641) a Danish admiral, nobleman and landowner
 Frederik Danneskjold-Samsøe (1703 in Assendrup Manor – 1778) a politician, minister, admiral, chief of the Danish marine
 Jacob Holm (1770 in Skafterup – 1845) a Danish industrialist, ship owner and merchant
 Christian Winther (1796 in Fensmark – 1876) a Danish lyric poet 
 Malthe Conrad Lottrup (1815 in Holmegaard – 1870) a Danish merchant, politician and brewer 
 Matilde Bajer (1840 in Frederikseg – 1934) a Danish women's rights activist and pacifist
 Eggert Achen (1853 in Kvislemark – 1913) a Danish architect
 L. A. Ring (1854 in Ring – 1933) a Danish painter, pioneered symbolism and social realism 
 Bodil Hellfach (1856 in Hyllinge – 1941) a pioneering Danish nurse
 Charlotte Munck (1876 in Lille Næstved – 1932) a pioneering Danish nurse 
 Knud Børge Martinsen (1905 in Sandved - 1949) a Danish officer in the Free Corps Denmark
 Michel Nykjær (born 1979 in Tappernøje) a Danish auto racing driver

Image gallery

References 

 Municipal statistics: NetBorger Kommunefakta, delivered from KMD aka Kommunedata (Municipal Data)
 Municipal mergers and neighbors: Eniro new municipalities map

External links 

 Gavnø island (Danish only)
 Næstved area tourism bureau
 Næstved bibliotek 
 Næstved municipality's official website (Danish only)
 NæstvedNyt (Video news)
 Sjølundkirken (Danish only)

 
Municipalities of Region Zealand
Municipalities of Denmark
Populated places established in 2007